Mohd Zaidy bin Abdul Talib is a Malaysian politician and served as Selangor State Executive Councillor.

Election results

References

Living people
1972 births
Malaysian people of Malay descent
Malaysian Muslims
Malaysian Islamic Party politicians
Members of the Selangor State Legislative Assembly
Selangor state executive councillors
21st-century Malaysian politicians